The women's 100 metres hurdles event at the 2011 All-Africa Games was held on 13 September.

Results
Wind: +4.2 m/s

References
Results
Results

100
2011 in women's athletics